Be Prepared may refer to:

 "Be Prepared", the Scout Motto of the Scouting movement
 "Be Prepared", a song originally on his studio album Songs by Tom Lehrer parodying the Scouts
 "Be Prepared" (song), a song originally from the Disney film The Lion King
 "Be Prepared" (Tim Rogers song), an alternative rock song 
 "Be Prepared" (That's So Raven), an episode of That's So Raven